Coelostomidiidae is a family of scales and mealybugs in the order Hemiptera. There are about 5 genera and 11 described species in Coelostomidiidae.

Genera
These five genera belong to the family Coelostomidiidae:
 Coelostomidia Cockerell 1900
 Crambostoma Gavrilov-Zimin 2018
 Eremostoma Gavrilov-Zimin 2018
 Ultracoelostoma Cockerell 1902
 † Cancerococcus Koteja, 1988

References

Further reading

 

Scale insects
Hemiptera families